The Athletics at the 2016 Summer Paralympics – Women's 100 metres T36 event at the 2016 Paralympic Games took place on 9 September 2016, at the Estádio Olímpico João Havelange.

Heats

Heat 1 
17:30 8 September 2016:

Heat 2 
17:37 8 September 2016:

Final 
10:43 9 September 2016:

Notes

Athletics at the 2016 Summer Paralympics